Johannes West (born 1782, died 1835), was Denmark's inspector of Nordgrønland.

He took over as inspector of Nordgrønland in 1817 after Peter Motzfeldt, even though Frederik Diderik Sechmann Fleischer had filled in for Motzfeldt in the last two years of his work, and was seen by many as his natural successor.

References
Slægten Peter Lund from Godthåb, Grønland

Danish civil servants
Inspectors of Greenland
1782 births
1835 deaths